Acrolepia rejecta is a moth of the  family Acrolepiidae. It was described by Edward Meyrick in 1922. It is found in China.

References

Moths described in 1922
Acrolepiidae